Sanford Meisner: The American Theatre's Best Kept Secret is a 1990 American documentary biography film directed by Nick Doob.

Cast

References

External links
 

American documentary films
1990 documentary films
1990 films
American biographical films
1990s biographical films
Films produced by Sydney Pollack
Eagle Rock Entertainment
Columbia Pictures films
Public Broadcasting Service
1990s American films